Mae Ai is home to the district headquarters of Mae Ai District in the top of Chiang Mai province, Thailand. 174 km from the city of Chiang Mai and 107 km from City of Chiang Rai.

History
Mae Ai municipality was upgraded form sanitation municipality on May 25, 1999. It governs 10 Mubans of Mae Ai Subdistrict and 7 Mubans of Malika Subdistrict.

Agriculture
The agriculture in Mae Ai is highly competitive, diversified and specialised and it produced in significant amounts include rice, pepper, orange, lychee, longan etc. Agriculture is one of its main economic activities.

References

Cities and towns in Chiang Mai province